Spreebogenpark is a park in Tiergarten, Berlin, Germany.

External links
 

Parks in Berlin